The Trekking Elise is a French single-place paraglider that was designed and produced by Trekking Parapentes of Lambesc. Introduced in 2002, it is now out of production.

Design and development
The Elise was designed as an intermediate glider. The models are each named for their relative size.

Variants
Elise S
Small-sized model for lighter pilots. The glider model is AFNOR Standard certified.
Elise M
Mid-sized model for medium-weight pilots. The glider model is AFNOR Standard certified.
Elise L
Large-sized model for heavier pilots. The glider model is AFNOR Standard certified.

Specifications (Elise M)

References

Elise
Paragliders